Makeda Silvera (born 1955 in Kingston, Jamaica) is a Jamaican Canadian novelist and short story writer.

Biography
Silvera emigrated to Canada at the age of 12 with her family, and currently lives in Toronto, Ontario. She published two volumes of short stories in the 1990s before releasing her first novel, The Revenge of Maria, in 1998, followed by The Heart Does Not Bend in 2002. An out lesbian, she is the cofounder and managing editor of Sister Vision Press, and has edited a number of anthologies, including Piece of My Heart (1991), the first North American anthology of literature by lesbians of colour. Piece of My Heart was described in the Canadian Journal of Women and the Law as "a landmark collection of disparate lesbian voices. By combining reprinted material by such renowned lesbian writers as Audre Lorde, Cheryl Clarke, Jewell L. Gomez, Chrystos, and Barbara Smith with work by such thought-provoking new writers as Raymina Y. Mays, Karin Aguilar-San Juan, Milagros Paredes, and Nice Rodriguez, Silvera creates an enduring testimony to the inextricable connection between literature and social activism for innumerable multi-ethnic and multi-racial lesbians."

Works

 Silenced: Caribbean Domestic Workers Talk With Makeda Silvera (1989, interviews)
 Remembering G (1990, short stories)
 Piece of My Heart: A Lesbian-of-Colour Anthology (1991, ed.)
 Her Head a Village (1994, short stories)
 The Other Woman: Women of Colour in Contemporary Canadian Literature (1994, ed.)
 Ma-Ka: Diaspora Juks (1997, ed.)
 The Heart Does Not Bend (2002, novel)

References 

1955 births
Living people
Canadian women novelists
Jamaican women short story writers
Jamaican short story writers
Jamaican emigrants to Canada
Black Canadian writers
Jamaican LGBT writers
Canadian lesbian writers
Canadian LGBT novelists
Canadian women short story writers
Black Canadian women
People from Kingston, Jamaica
Writers from Toronto
Jamaican women novelists
Black Canadian LGBT people
20th-century Canadian novelists
21st-century Canadian novelists
20th-century Canadian women writers
21st-century Canadian women writers
20th-century Canadian short story writers
21st-century Canadian short story writers
20th-century Jamaican novelists
21st-century Jamaican novelists
Lesbian novelists
21st-century Canadian LGBT people
20th-century Canadian LGBT people